is a Japanese footballer who plays for Renofa Yamaguchi.

Club statistics
Updated to 23 February 2016.

References

External links

Profile at Renofa Yamaguchi FC

1989 births
Living people
Aoyama Gakuin University alumni
People from Shiroi
Association football people from Chiba Prefecture
Japanese footballers
J2 League players
J3 League players
Japan Football League players
SP Kyoto FC players
Iwate Grulla Morioka players
Renofa Yamaguchi FC players
Association football goalkeepers